The 2010 IIHF World Women's U18 Championship Division I tournament was held in Piešťany, Slovakia, from 3 to 9 April 2010. Switzerland won the tournament and after a year they returned to the top division.

Final standings

 is promoted to the Top Division of the 2011 IIHF World Women's U18 Championship

Results

References

IIHF World Women's U18 Championship – Division I
World
World
International ice hockey competitions hosted by Slovakia
2009–10 in Slovak ice hockey